The Abbey Lounge was a dive bar and nightclub in Inman Square in Somerville, Massachusetts. First opened in 1907, it didn't become officially established until after prohibition ended in 1933. It closed in November 2008. Following its closure, the location was purchased by new owners, renovated and reopened in 2009 as Trina's Starlight Lounge.

The first of many of the original "Abbey bands" to enter the scene was SCHNOCKERED, debuting at the Abbey Lounge every other Wednesday night beginning in March 1998 until the first official weekend production featuring headliners heavy stud, May 1, 1999.

References

Nightclubs in Massachusetts
Drinking establishments in Massachusetts
Buildings and structures in Somerville, Massachusetts
Defunct nightclubs in the United States
Bars (establishments)